Waterloo is an unincorporated community in Kingman County, Kansas, United States.

History
The post office in Waterloo closed in 1912.

Education
The community is served by Kingman–Norwich USD 331 public school district.

References

Further reading

External links
 , from Hatteberg's People on KAKE TV news
 Kingman County maps: Current, Historic, KDOT

Unincorporated communities in Kingman County, Kansas
Unincorporated communities in Kansas